Paraplatyptilia hedemanni is a moth of the family Pterophoridae. It is found in the Russian Far East (Primorye), Mongolia and central Asia.

References

Moths described in 1884
hedemanni